The 24th Academy Awards were held on March 20, 1952, honoring the films of 1951. The ceremony was hosted by Danny Kaye.

An American in Paris and A Place in the Sun each received six Oscars, splitting Best Picture and Best Director, respectively. A Streetcar Named Desire won four Oscars, including three of the four acting awards for which it was nominated. The film's only unsuccessful acting nomination was that of Marlon Brando, whose performance as Stanley Kowalski was later considered one of the most influential of modern film acting.

Humphrey Bogart was the last man born in the 19th century to win Best Actor.

An American in Paris became the second color film to win Best Picture, and was the first film since Grand Hotel to win Best Picture without any acting nominations.

Awards

Nominations were announced on February 11, 1952. Winners are listed first and highlighted in boldface.

Academy Honorary Award
Gene Kelly for "his versatility as an actor, singer, director and dancer, and specifically for his brilliant achievements in the art of choreography on film" for An American in Paris.
 When Worlds Collide for Best Special Effects

Best Foreign Language Film
Rashomon (Japan)

Irving G. Thalberg Memorial Award
Arthur Freed

Presenters
Lucille Ball (Presenter: Short Subject Awards)
Charles Brackett (Presenter: Honorary Award to Gene Kelly)
Leslie Caron (Presenter: Best Foreign Language Film)
Marge and Gower Champion (Presenters: Best Art Direction)
Cyd Charisse (Presenter: Best Sound Recording)
Ronald Colman (Presenter: Best Actress)
Sally Forrest (Presenter: Best Special Effects)
Zsa Zsa Gabor (Presenter: Best Costume Design)
Greer Garson (Presenter: Best Actor)
Jesse L. Lasky (Presenter: Best Motion Picture)
Claire Luce (Presenter: Writing Awards)
Joseph L. Mankiewicz (Presenter: Best Director)
George Murphy (Presenter: Scientific or Technical Awards)
Donald O'Connor (Presenter: Music Awards)
Janice Rule (Presenter: Documentary Awards)
George Sanders (Presenter: Best Supporting Actress)
Constance Smith (Presenter: Best Film Editing)
Claire Trevor (Presenter: Best Supporting Actor)
Vera-Ellen (Presenter: Best Cinematography)
Darryl F. Zanuck (Presenter: Irving G. Thalberg Memorial Award)

Performers
Kay Brown
Dick Haymes
Howard Keel and Jane Powell
Jane Wyman

Multiple nominations and awards

These films had multiple nominations:

12 nominations: A Streetcar Named Desire
9 nominations: A Place in the Sun
8 nominations: An American in Paris and Quo Vadis
5 nominations: David and Bathsheba and Death of a Salesman
4 nominations: The African Queen and Detective Story
3 nominations: The Great Caruso
2 nominations: The Blue Veil, Bright Victory, Decision Before Dawn, The Frogmen, Here Comes the Groom, La Ronde, On the Riviera, Show Boat, The Tales of Hoffmann, and The Well

The following films received multiple awards.

6 wins: An American in Paris and A Place in the Sun
4 wins: A Streetcar Named Desire

See also
9th Golden Globe Awards
1951 in film
 3rd Primetime Emmy Awards
 4th Primetime Emmy Awards
 5th British Academy Film Awards
 6th Tony Awards

References

Academy Awards ceremonies
1951 film awards
1952 in American cinema
1952 in Los Angeles
March 1952 events in the United States